Hans Henrik Holm (18 January 1896 – 27 September 1980) was a Norwegian poet and folklorist. He made his literary début in 1933 with the epic poem Jonsoknatt, the first in a series of seven volumes. His published the trilogy Bygdir i solrøyk between 1949 and 1951. He was awarded the Gyldendal's Endowment in 1950.

References

1896 births
1980 deaths
Writers from Oslo
20th-century Norwegian poets
Norwegian male poets
20th-century Norwegian male writers